The Amazing Race 33 is the thirty-third season of the American reality television show The Amazing Race. It featured eleven teams of two competing in a race around the world.

Though filming started in February 2020, the COVID-19 pandemic caused production to be placed on hold for over a year and a half. The race resumed in September 2021 with most of the original teams and a modified route. The season premiered on CBS on January 5, 2022, and the season finale aired on March 2, 2022.

Married internet personalities Kim and Penn Holderness were the winners of this season, while flight attendants Raquel Moore and Cayla Platt finished in second place, and best friends Ryan Ferguson and Dusty Harris finished in third.

Production

Development and filming

In January 2020, during the winter press tour for the Television Critics Association in Pasadena, California, Amazing Race co-creators and executive producers Bertram van Munster and Elise Doganieri, who were promoting their new National Geographic show Race to the Center of the Earth, confirmed to Andy Dehnart of Reality Blurred that they would be filming a thirty-third season of The Amazing Race later in the year. 

Filming began on February 22, 2020 as usual, after host Phil Keoghan finished filming the first season of Tough as Nails. This season of The Amazing Race started with Keoghan contacting teams at their homes, instructing them to travel to London, and it was expected to conclude in mid-March. However, filming was suspended on February 28 after three legs had been completed in England and Scotland with the contestants and production crew sent home as a precaution due to the worsening COVID-19 pandemic. According to van Munster, he contacted CBS after he and his crew arrived in Sweden to film in Lapland, where the fourth leg was to take place, to halt the season due to the dangers of the emerging pandemic. In addition to Sweden, the remainder of the original racecourse prior to production shutdown would have visited Austria, Italy, Vietnam, Thailand, South America, and a first-time visit to Nepal.

COVID-19 shutdown
After the season was suspended, Phil Keoghan stated that the show intended to resume filming where it had left off, but he also acknowledged that filming could not resume until viral transmissions declined. Kelly Kahl, the President of CBS Entertainment, stated that the show would film "as soon as we can safely get back into production" with the producers working to "plot out a race that sticks to countries that are safe" but acknowledged the difficulties of "literally [having] to navigate some international waters." Kahl also stated that he wasn't aware of any contestants that had dropped out of the season. Keoghan later stated a year later that he could not guarantee that every team would be able to return once filming restarted. In April 2021, Mitch Graham, SVP of Alternative Programming, stated that production looked at the option of going to COVID-light countries but that it was unlikely as it would not lead to the same experience of traveling the globe. The following month, the creators of the show stated that they have plans to resume filming the season once they can assure team safety with mass vaccinations in target travel locations. Kahl stated that he hoped to have the season air in the midseason of the 2021–22 television season provided that enough countries open up in the coming months to film the remaining legs. In an interview with Gold Derby in June 2021, Keoghan stated that a plan to film safely had been established.

Resumption of filming

In September 2021, Thom Sherman, the Senior Executive Vice President, Programming, CBS Entertainment, announced at the Television Critics Association that the show was in pre-production and would return for the 2021–22 television season. In order to restart the season, production chartered an Amazing Race-branded Titan Airways Boeing 757 for subsequent travel by teams and crew, which included four COVID testing teams, to reduce infection risk. To account for common travel on the chartered jet, teams were released from the charter plane in a number of groups, with those who had checked in at the previous Pit Stop earlier able to start the next leg earlier. Keoghan said that the use of a chartered jet was something they had considered to use on the show previously as it eliminated problems with airports, and in this season, they at times did not inform the racers where their next destination was until they landed, making it like a mystery tour for the racers. New tasks were developed with social distancing in mind, with preference for outdoor activities rather than crowded indoor ones. Teams were still made to rely on either their own driving or using public transportation where production affirmed that drivers took COVID precautions.

Racers traveled to Switzerland and resumed racing on September 19, 2021, after  (nearly nineteen months). The remaining legs after Scotland were altered to have travel proceed through locations with the lowest COVID-19 rates: Zürich, Lugano, Corsica, Halkidiki, Thessaloniki, and Lisbon before returning to Los Angeles. However, four teams were unable to return after production resumed due to extenuating circumstances: Anthony was unable to return due to work; Caro & Ray had broken up during the hiatus and Caro's work visa had expired, meaning she was unable to return to the United States due to travel restrictions against non-U.S. citizens; Connie and Sam were expecting a child when the restart was planned; and Taylor was on bereavement following the death of his brother from COVID-19 which had occurred shortly before the planned restart. Two teams that had been originally eliminated before the production shutdown, Michael & Moe and Arun & Natalia, were brought back to the competition. Filming of the season wrapped in October.

Casting
This season saw Jesse Tannenbaum, who was recently promoted to casting director of Survivor starting with Island of the Idols, become the show's new casting director, a role he previously held during season 29 and season 30, after Lynne Spillman's contract with CBS expired in 2018. The cast was announced by CBS on December 10, 2021.

Cast

The cast included Love Island season 1 couple Caro Viehweg and Ray Gantt; married internet personalities Kim and Penn Holderness; 2015 Thalys train attack heroes Anthony Sadler and Spencer Stone; and Ryan Ferguson, who spent ten years in prison after being wrongfully convicted.

Future appearances
In 2022, Caro Viehweg and Ray Gantt appeared on the fifth season of MTV's Ex on the Beach. Cayla Platt competed on The Challenge: USA.

Results 
The following teams are listed with their placements in each leg. Placements are listed in finishing order. Note that the race was suspended at the end of Leg 3 due to the COVID-19 pandemic and resumed a year-and-a-half later. 

A  placement with a dagger indicates that the team was eliminated. 
An italicized and underlined placement indicates that the team was the last to arrive, but there was no rest period at the pit stop and all teams were instructed to continue racing. There was no required Speed Bump task in the next leg.
An  placement with a double-dagger indicates that the team was the last to arrive at a pit stop in a non-elimination leg, and was the only team to begin the subsequent leg in the final departure group.

Notes

Race summary

Leg 1 (United States → England)

Episode 1: "We're Back!" (January 5, 2022)
Prize: A trip for two to the Turks and Caicos Islands (awarded to Anthony & Spencer)
Eliminated: Michael & Moe
Locations
Assorted Cities (Teams' Homes) (Start)
 New York City, New York  Los Angeles, California  Charlotte, North Carolina  Chicago, Illinois → London, England
London (Trafalgar Square)
London (Buckingham Palace – Canada Gate)
London (South Molton Street – Mess Hall at Immersive LDN  Parliament Square, Little Ben & Piccadilly Station) 
London (Soho – The Chipping Forecast)
London (Natural History Museum) 
Episode summary
Instead of a traditional starting line, teams received a video message from Phil Keoghan informing them of the start of The Amazing Race. Teams then had to fly from their local airports to London, England, make their way to Trafalgar Square, and find one of four men dressed as a red telephone box with their next clue. They were then instructed to travel by foot down The Mall to Buckingham Palace, where they found their next clue.
 This season's first Detour was a choice between Artist Den or Digiben. In Artist Den, teams had to properly paste a 36-piece Banksy-style poster to a wall in order to receive their next clue. In Digiben, teams had to find a bobby in Parliament Square by Big Ben, then find a promoter by Little Ben, who sent them to DJ Digiben in Piccadilly Circus tube station, who had their next clue.
After completing the Detour, teams had to find "The Queen and Boris Johnson having a nosh" (a pair of impersonators) at The Chipping Forecast in order to receive their next clue, which directed them to the pit stop beneath the blue whale skeleton at the Natural History Museum.

Leg 2 (England)

Episode 2: "It Can't Be That Easy" (January 5, 2022)
Locations
London (St Mary Abbots) 
London (Postal Museum – Mail Rail) 
London (Leicester Square)
London (Flight Club Shoreditch  Mange) 
London (ArcelorMittal Orbit ) (Unaired)
London (Russell Square Metro Station – Double-Decker Bus) 
Episode summary
At the beginning of this leg, teams had to make their way to the Postal Museum in London in order to find their next clue.
 In this season's first Roadblock, one team member had to ride a train along the Mail Rail to a loading dock and sort through a bin filled with packages and envelopes in order to find their next clue.
After completing the Roadblock, teams had to travel to Leicester Square, where they found their next clue.
 This leg's Detour was a choice between Bullseye, Mate or Decorate. In Bullseye, Mate, both team members had to score a bullseye on a dartboard in the same round in order to receive their next clue. In Decorate, teams were presented with twelve cakes decorated like the flags of various countries. Teams had to determine which two flags belonged to countries that were part of the European Union (France and Germany) and then replicate the two cakes in order to receive their next clue.
Teams had to check in at the pit stop on a double-decker bus at the Russell Square Metro Station.
Additional notes
The Flight Club Shoreditch was misidentified in the show as Flight Club Victoria.
After completing the Detour, teams had to climb to the top of the ArcelorMittal Orbit in order to receive their next clue. This task was unaired.
There was no elimination at the end of this leg; all teams were instead directed to continue racing.
Legs 1 and 2 aired back-to-back as a special two-hour episode.

Leg 3 (England → Scotland)

Episode 3: "Who Has This One in the Bag?" (January 12, 2022)
Prize: A trip for two to Cape Cod, Massachusetts (awarded to Kim & Penn)
Eliminated: Arun & Natalia
Locations
 London → Glasgow, Scotland
Glasgow (Glasgow Central Station – NCP Car Park)
Luss (Culag Lochside Guest House) (Unaired)
Glasgow (Òran Mór) 
Glasgow (Alexandra Park – Saracen Fountain)
Glasgow (Britannia Panopticon Music Hall  Fishers Cooperage) 
Glasgow (University of Glasgow Cloisters) 
Episode summary
At the beginning of this leg, teams were instructed to travel on an overnight Caledonian Sleeper train to Glasgow, Scotland, where they found their next clue on the windshield of a marked vehicle at NCP Car Park.
 In this leg's Roadblock, one team member had to assemble a set of bagpipes and then play a drone alongside the Johnstone Pipe Band for the length of the Scottish national anthem in order to receive their next clue.
After completing the Roadblock, teams had to find their next clue at the Saracen Fountain in Alexandra Park.
 This leg's Detour was a choice between Kilt or Rebuilt. In Kilt, teams had to learn and perform the song "Donald Where's Your Troosers?" in Highland dress in order to receive their next clue. In Rebuilt, teams had to remove the top two metal hoops from two whisky barrels, hammer a new head into each barrel's croze, and then replace the hoops in order to receive their next clue.
Teams had to check in at the pit stop at the University of Glasgow.
Additional notes
After arriving in Scotland, teams had to drive to Culag Lochside Guest House on the shores of Loch Lomond and use a mallet to pop a bung out of a barrel in order to retrieve their next clue. This task was unaired.
At the end of the leg, Phil Keoghan gathered all of the teams at the pit stop to announce that production of the race was suspended on account of the COVID-19 pandemic and all teams were sent home.

Leg 4 (Switzerland)

Episode 4: "Ready to Restart the Race" (January 19, 2022)
Prize:  each (awarded to Ryan & Dusty)
Eliminated: Michael & Moe
Locations
St. Gallen, Switzerland (St. Gallen Cathedral) (Restarting Line)
 St. Gallen (Museumstrasse) → Hundwil (Schwägalp Pass)
 Hundwil (Säntis) 
Urnäsch (Gasthaus Sonne)
Urnäsch (Frehner Farm  Schulanlage AU) 
Altstätten (Field) (Unaired) 
Altstätten (Marktgasse) 
Episode summary
After a nineteen-month break in filming, teams gathered outside St. Gallen Cathedral in St. Gallen, Switzerland, to resume racing. Anthony & Spencer, Caro & Ray, Connie & Sam, and Taylor & Isaiah were unable to rejoin production due to extenuating circumstances, while Michael & Moe and Arun & Natalia, who had been originally eliminated before production was suspended, were brought back to rejoin the race.
At the start of this leg, teams had to search the Museumstrasse for one of three buses to the Schwägalp Pass, where they had to take a cable car to the summit of the Säntis in order to find their next clue.
 In this leg's Roadblock, one team member had to navigate a via ferrata to their next clue.
After completing the Roadblock, teams found their next clue at the Gasthaus Sonne in Urnäsch.
 This leg's Detour was a choice between Punch It or Toss It. In Punch It, teams had to attach ornaments to a Swiss belt in a specific order in order to receive their next clue. In Toss It, teams had to learn and correctly perform a Swiss flag throwing routine known as Fahnenschwingen in order to receive their next clue.
Teams had to check in at the pit stop: the Marktgasse in Altstätten.
Additional notes
 Michael & Moe and Arun & Natalia had to complete a Speed Bump after the Detour that involved one team member running inside a ball resembling a cabbage while being directed by their partner to knock down haystacks before they could continue racing. This task was unaired.

Leg 5 (Switzerland)

Episode 5: "Stairway to Hell" (January 26, 2022)
Prize: A trip for two to Dominica (awarded to Ryan & Dusty)
Locations
Altstätten (Marktgasse) 
Tenero-Contra (Verzasca Dam) 
Lugano (Piazza Carlo Battaglini)
Lugano (Salita degli Angioli  Gabbani Salumeria) 
Lugano (Parco Ciani ) 
Episode summary
At the beginning of this leg, teams departed from Altstätten in groups of two and in 15-minute intervals in the same order that they finished the previous leg.
 This leg's Roadblock was a Switchback from season 14, where one team member had to perform a  bungee jump off of the Verzasca Dam along with their Travelocity Roaming Gnome in order to receive a satchel with a miniature clue.
After completing the Roadblock, teams had to find their next clue at the Piazza Carlo Battaglini in Lugano.
 This leg's Detour was a choice between Bartender Race or Sausage Encase. In Bartender Race, teams had to deliver twelve bottles of wine and twelve bags of chestnuts from street vendors to a cocktail party atop the  Salita degli Angioli stairway in order to receive their next clue. In Sausage Encase, teams had to squeeze out  of luganighetta sausage, and then divide it into four coiled portions in order to receive their next clue.
After completing the Detour, teams had to retrieve a photograph from their gnome's satchel and figure out that it depicted the pit stop: the Parco Ciani in Lugano.
Additional notes
This was a non-elimination leg.

Leg 6 (Switzerland → France)

Episode 6: "Say Cheese" (February 2, 2022)
Prize:  each (awarded to Kim & Penn)
Eliminated: Akbar & Sheri
Locations
 Milan, Italy → Bastia, France
Castello-di-Rostino (Ponte Novu) 
Corte (Belvédère de Corte)
Corte (Fromagerie Fermière Chez Jean Paul & Claire) 
Venaco (Verghellu Canyon Altipiani) 
 Giuncaggio (Cardiccia Dam → Camping Ernella) 
Episode summary
During the pit stop, teams were flown to Corsica and began the next leg at the Ponte Novu. Teams departed in groups 15 minutes apart based on the order of their arrival at the previous pit stop.
At the Belvédère de Corte, teams had to find their next clue and a canister of goat milk, which they needed for the Detour.
 This leg's Detour was a choice between Say Cheese or Mule, Please. In Say Cheese, teams had to make three baskets of cheese and then deliver them to a storage cave in order to receive their next clue. In Mule, Please, teams had to properly strap a harness to a mule and then deliver two milk canisters to the fromagerie without spilling any of the milk in order to receive their next clue.
 In this leg's Roadblock, one team member had to go canyoning through a  river course in order to find their next clue.
After completing the Roadblock, teams had to inflate a kayak and then paddle up the Tavignano River to the pit stop at the Cardiccia Dam.
Additional notes
The Ponte Novu was misidentified on the show as the Pont Altiani.

Leg 7 (France)

Episode 7: "Gently Down the Stream" (February 9, 2022)
Prize: A trip for two to Antalya, Turkey (awarded to Kim & Penn)
Locations
Giuncaggio (Camping Ernella) 
Zonza (Tour de Fautea)
Pinarello (Pinarello Beach) 
Bonifacio (Port de Plaisance) 
Bonifacio (U Rastello)
Bonifacio (Bonifacio Cliffs) 
Episode summary
At the beginning of this leg, teams were instructed to travel to the Tour de Fautea in Zonza, where both team members had to eat a piece of bread with casu marzu (cheese containing maggots) in order to receive their next clue. Teams departed from the pit stop in groups 15 minutes apart based on the order of their arrival at the previous pit stop.
 This leg's Detour was a choice between Row, Row, Row Your Boat or Gently Down the Stream. In Row, Row, Row Your Boat, teams had to paddle a transparent kayak into the Mediterranean Sea and retrieve ten matching metal fish in order to receive their next clue. In Gently Down the Stream, teams had to take a 15-minute cruise on a glass-bottom boat, look for ten metal fish, and then find a fish chart with the same sequence of fish at the dive shop in order to receive their next clue.
 In this leg's Roadblock, one team member had to repair the holes in a fishing net in order to receive their next clue.
At U Rastello, teams had to find a Napoleon impersonator, who directed them to the pit stop at the Bonifacio Cliffs.
Additional notes
This was a non-elimination leg.

Leg 8 (France → Greece)

Episode 8: "Souvlaki" (February 16, 2022)
Prize:  each (awarded to Kim & Penn)
Eliminated: Lulu & Lala
Locations
 Figari → Thessaloniki, Greece
Thermaikos (Peraia Beach) 
Nea Gonia (Konstantinos Olive Grove)
Nea Gonia (Marianna's Vineyard) 
Heraklea (Heraklea Beach – Mamo's Kantina Stand)
Heraklea (Saint George Church) 
Nea Kallikrateia (Nea Kallikrateia Pier) 
Episode summary
During the pit stop, teams were flown to Thessaloniki, Greece, and began the next leg at Peraia Beach. Teams departed in groups 15 minutes apart based on the order of their arrival at the previous pit stop.
At the Konstantinos Olive Grove, teams had to search among the olive trees for their next clue.
 In this leg's first Roadblock, one team member had to properly make 60 dolmades in order to receive their next clue.
At Mamo's Kantina Stand, teams had to order the dish of the day (souvlaki), spell its name, and then eat it before finding their next clue on the wrapper.
 In this leg's second Roadblock, the team member who did not perform the previous Roadblock had to listen to a 15-minute sermon from a Greek Orthodox priest, who listed facts about ten Eastern Orthodox saints. They were then asked five questions about what they'd heard and had to answer correctly in order to receive their next clue.
Teams had to check in at the pit stop at the Nea Kallikrateia Pier.

Leg 9 (Greece)

Episode 9: "Rock Bottom" (February 23, 2022)
Prize: A trip for two to Kauai, Hawaii (awarded to Raquel & Cayla)
Locations
Nea Kallikrateia (Nea Kallikrateia Pier) 
Thessaloniki (Theatro Dassous) 
Thessaloniki (Trigonion Tower)
Thessaloniki (Cafe Jasmine) 
Thessaloniki (White Tower) 
Episode summary
At the beginning of this leg, teams were instructed to travel to the Theatro Dassous in Thessaloniki. Teams departed in groups 15 minutes apart based on the order of their arrival at the previous pit stop.
 In this leg's Roadblock, one team member had to turn over stones until they found one of four gold coins that they could exchange with an Oracle of Delphi impersonator for their next clue.
At the Trigonion Tower, teams had to listen to words of wisdom from a Socrates impersonator before receiving their next clue.
 This season's final Detour was a choice between Bring 'Em or Break 'Em. In Bring 'Em, teams would have had to deliver 300 plates uphill to the Cafe Jasmine in order to receive a miniature clue from the restaurant owner. In Break 'Em, team members had to alternate breaking plates while a band played until they found a miniature clue. All teams chose to break plates.
Teams had to check in at the pit stop: the White Tower of Thessaloniki, where they were greeted with words of wisdom from a Diogenes the Cynic impersonator.
Additional notes
This was a non-elimination leg.

Leg 10 (Greece → Portugal)

Episode 10: "No Room For Error" (March 2, 2022)
Prize: A trip for two to Saint Lucia (awarded to Raquel & Cayla)
Eliminated: Arun & Natalia
Locations
 Thessaloniki → Lisbon, Portugal
Almada (Sanctuary of Christ the King) 
Setúbal (Fortaleza de São Filipe)
Setúbal (Fisherman's Wharf) 
Setúbal (Mercearia Confiança de Troino & Rua Vasco da Gama)
Cabo Espichel (Santuário de Cabo Espichel ) 
Cabo Espichel (Farol de Cabo Espichel) 
Episode summary
During the pit stop, teams were flown to Lisbon, Portugal, and began the next leg at the Sanctuary of Christ the King. Teams were instructed to travel to the Fortaleza de São Filipe, where they had to climb to the top of the fort, search for an Amazing Race flag, and then drive to its location in order to find their next clue. Teams departed in groups 15 minutes apart based on the order of their arrival at the previous pit stop.
 In this leg's first Roadblock, one team member had to search among several rowboats named after famous Portuguese individuals until they found one of four named after a Portuguese explorer (Bartolomeu Dias, Fernão de Magalhães, Pedro Álvares Cabral, or Vasco da Gama). They then had to row it across the marina to a fisherman in order to receive their next clue.
At the Mercearia Confiança de Troino, teams had to pick a sardine can, make their way to Rua Vasco da Gama, and then paint its design on a specified door in order to receive their next clue.
 In this season's final Roadblock, the team member who did not perform the previous Roadblock had to count the church's columns while standing within a stone boundary and give the correct number to a monk, who then directed them to the pit stop at the Farol de Cabo Espichel.

Leg 11 (Portugal → United States)

Episode 11: "In the Hands of the Amazing Race Gods" (March 2, 2022)
Winners: Kim & Penn
Second Place: Raquel & Cayla
Third Place: Ryan & Dusty
Locations
 Lisbon → Los Angeles, California
Los Angeles (Westin Bonaventure Hotel) 
Los Angeles (El Pueblo de Los Ángeles Historical Monument)
Los Angeles (6465 Sunset Boulevard – S.I.R. Hollywood)
Carson (Dignity Health Sports Park – Tennis Stadium)
Carson (Dignity Health Sports Park – Soccer Stadium) 
Episode summary
During the pit stop, teams were flown to Los Angeles, California, and began the final leg simultaneously on the roof of the Westin Bonaventure Hotel. There, teams had to make their way to a clue box atop three of the hotel's four towers and spot the combination "going up and down" on an elevator that they needed to unlock their next clue.
At the El Pueblo de Los Ángeles Historical Monument, one team member had to direct their partner, who was blindfolded with a luchador mask, to hit three specific piñatas that held the three parts of their next clue. When assembled, their clue directed them to S.I.R. Hollywood, where teams had to use props to add sound effects in sync to five silent video clips from previous seasons in order to receive their next clue. The video clips included: Brendon & Rachel performing the Running with the Ballz Detour in season 24, Lena unrolling hay bales in season 6, Claire being hit with a watermelon in season 17, Amanda & Kris performing the Austrian Folly Detour in season 14, and Colin performing the Plow Detour in season 5.
Teams were next instructed to find the home of the LA Galaxy: Dignity Health Sports Park. There, teams had to answer thirteen riddles by placing the correct tennis rackets with images of people, places, and items that they'd encountered since Leg 4 onto the riddles before a chair umpire directed them to the finish line at the nearby soccer stadium. 
{|class="wikitable unsortable" style="text-align:left"
|-
! scope="col" | Question
! scope="col" | Answer
|-
! scope="row" style="text-align:left" | You were greeted at the pit stop withthese words
|We have two ears and one tongue sothat we would listen more and talk less.
|-
! scope="row" style="text-align:left" | This mode of transportationtook you the rest of the way
|Corte cars
|-
! scope="row" style="text-align:left" | You found this under a rock
|Gold coin
|-
! scope="row" style="text-align:left" | It went this far up
|8000 ft elevation
|-
! scope="row" style="text-align:left" | It fell out as well
|Red & yellow piñata candies
|-
! scope="row" style="text-align:left" | He greeted you with a smile and a drink
|Bonifacio pit stop greeter Stefan
|-
! scope="row" style="text-align:left" | Under this, he pointed the way
|Napoleon Bonaparte with a bicorne
|-
! scope="row" style="text-align:left" | He joined you throughout the leg
|Travelocity Roaming Gnome
|-
! scope="row" style="text-align:left" | You checked in here
|Parco Ciani
|-
! scope="row" style="text-align:left" | You painted this
|Setúbal door
|-
! scope="row" style="text-align:left" | Something you had to eat
|Souvlaki
|-
! scope="row" style="text-align:left" | You took this to Number 10
|Setúbal rowboat
|-
! scope="row" style="text-align:left" | It's plated correctly
|Dolmades
|}
Additional notes
Legs 10 and 11 aired back-to-back as a special two-hour episode.

Reception

Critical response
The Amazing Race 33 received mixed-to-positive reviews. Andy Dehnart of reality blurred wrote that "The Amazing Race 33 was a great season overall. Even with some very thin legs, it felt to me like a throwback to earlier seasons, especially with the post-restart season not having any U-Turns or Yields." Sage Negron of Comic Book Resources wrote that "Season 33 ended up being one of the show's stronger outings." Sandy Casanova of Hidden Remote called it "another amazing season". Dustin Rowles of Pajiba called it "a strange and almost surreal season of The Amazing Race." Denton Davidson of Gold Derby wrote that he "loved most of the cast, but the pandemic and changes it caused this race really hurt the season overall." Daniel Fienberg of The Hollywood Reporter wrote that the season was "generally muted and limited challenge-wise" due to the pandemic.

Ratings
U.S. Nielsen ratings

Canadian ratings
Canadian broadcaster CTV also aired The Amazing Race on Wednesdays. Canadian DVR ratings are included in Numeris's count.

Episode 7, "Gently Down the Stream", aired during the opening week of the 2022 Winter Olympics.

References

External links

 33
2022 American television seasons
Television productions suspended due to the COVID-19 pandemic
Television shows filmed in California
Television shows filmed in Illinois
Television shows filmed in Michigan
Television shows filmed in New Jersey
Television shows filmed in New York (state)
Television shows filmed in North Carolina
Television shows filmed in Oregon
Television shows filmed in Tennessee
Television shows shot in London
Television shows filmed in Scotland
Television shows filmed in Switzerland
Television shows filmed in Italy
Television shows filmed in France
Television shows filmed in Greece
Television shows filmed in Portugal